In the United States, a Certified Nurse-Midwife (CNM) is a nurse midwife who exceeds the International Confederation of Midwives essential competencies for a midwife and is also an advanced practice registered nurse, having completed registered nursing and midwifery education leading to practice as a nurse midwife and credentialing as a Certified Nurse-Midwife. CNMs provide care of women across their lifespan, including pregnancy and the postpartum period, and well woman care and birth control. Certified Nurse-Midwives are exceptionally recognized by the International Confederation of Midwives as a type of midwife in the U.S.

Education and training 

The American College of Nurse-Midwives accredits midwifery education programs and serves as the national specialty society for the nation's CNMs and Certified Midwives (CMs). CNMs in most states are required to 
 possess a minimum of a graduate degree, such as the Master of Science in Nursing or Master of Science in Midwifery or a Doctorate of Nursing Practice or a Doctorate in Midwifery. 
 pass the NCLEX examination to become a registered nurse. 
 pass the American Midwifery Certification Board exam.
 hold a state license to practice midwifery or nurse-midwifery.
 keep up to date on latest knowledge as pertains to their field.

Practice
CNMs function as primary healthcare providers for women and most often provide medical care for relatively healthy women, whose health and births are considered uncomplicated and not "high risk," as well as their neonates. Often, women with high risk pregnancies can receive the benefits of midwifery care from a CNM in collaboration with a physician. CNMs may work closely or in collaboration with an obstetrician & gynecologist, who provides consultation and/or assistance to patients who develop complications or have complex medical histories or disease(s). CNMs provide health care for sexual health, as they also see women for routine exams and are able to initiate all types of contraception.

CNMs practice in hospitals and private practice medical clinics and may also deliver babies in birthing centers and attend at-home births. Some work with academic institutions as professors.  They are able to prescribe medications, treatments, medical devices, therapeutic and diagnostic measures. CNMs are able to provide medical care to women from puberty through menopause, including care for their newborn (neonatology), antepartum, intrapartum, postpartum and nonsurgical gynecological care. In some cases, CNMs may also provide care to the male partner, in areas of sexually transmitted diseases and reproductive health, of their female patients. In the United States, fewer than 1% of nurse midwives are men.

See also
 Mary Breckinridge, Founder of Frontier Nursing Service
 Childbirth
 Doula
 Nurse practitioner
 Obstetrical nursing

References

Nursing credentials and certifications
Midwifery in the United States
Advanced practice registered nursing